Camponotus irritans is a species of carpenter ant (genus Camponotus). It is found in many Asian and Oceanian countries.

Subspecies
Camponotus irritans carensis Emery, 1920 - Nicobar Islands
Camponotus irritans carinifer Viehmeyer, 1916 - Singapore
Camponotus irritans cliens Forel, 1911 - Indonesia
Camponotus irritans croceomaculatus Emery, 1914 - New Caledonia
Camponotus irritans curtus Emery, 1900 - Indonesia
Camponotus irritans fatuus Forel, 1886 - Indonesia
Camponotus irritans hongkongensis Forel, 1912 - China
Camponotus irritans inferior Emery, 1925 - Borneo
Camponotus irritans irritans Smith, F., 1857 - Malaysia, Sri Lanka
Camponotus irritans kubaryi Mayr, 1876 - Palau
Camponotus irritans melanogaster Stitz, 1938 - Micronesia
Camponotus irritans pallidus Smith, F., 1857 - Borneo, Bangladesh, Philippines
Camponotus irritans procax Santschi, 1919 - Vietnam
Camponotus irritans sumatranus Özdikmen, 2010 - Indonesia
Camponotus irritans tinctus Smith, F., 1858 - Myanmar

References

External links

 at antwiki.org
Itis.gov
Animaldiversity.org

irritans
Hymenoptera of Asia
Insects described in 1857